River Alexander (born November 29, 1999) is an American actor.

Early life
Alexander was born in Southwest Ranches, Florida. He attended American Heritage School in Plantation, Florida.

Career
Alexander's first professional performance was on stage at the age of 11 in New York City at the Public Theater in the musical Bloody Bloody Andrew Jackson. He then went on to perform in the Broadway national tour of Billy Elliot the Musical. He has had several episodic roles on television. His first film role was in 2013's summer indie hit The Way, Way Back in the role of Peter. He was also in Boychoir, which was released in 2015.

Filmography

Film

Television

Stage

Discography

Cast albums

Awards and nominations

References

External links 
 
 

Male actors from Florida
American male child actors
American male film actors
American male stage actors
American male television actors
Living people
People from Southwest Ranches, Florida
1999 births
American Heritage School (Florida) alumni